Rubus rosifolius, (sometimes spelled Rubus rosaefolius), also known as roseleaf bramble, Mauritius raspberry, thimbleberry, Vanuatu raspberry and bramble of the Cape is a prickly subshrub native to rainforest and tall open forest of the Himalayas, East Asia, and eastern Australia.

It is also found abundantly in the Brazilian states Minas Gerais, Rio de Janeiro and to the south as far as Rio Grande do Sul. The plant can also be found in a lot of San Francisco neighborhoods. This plants also grows in the wild in Puerto Rico and in highland along Indonesia.

Rose-leaf bramble leaves are compound with toothed margins, with glandular-hairs on both sides of leaflets. Flowers are white in panicles or solitary. Edible fruit are 2 cm long.

Leaves stay green and fruits ripen in early autumn in Eastern Australia.

Uses 
Although R. rosifolius is rarely cultivated, the plant has several uses. The fruit is sweet and pleasant flavoured when grown with good soil moisture. The fruit is also sold at markets in the Himalayas.

The leaf is used as a medicinal herbal tea for treating diarrhoea, menstrual pains, morning sickness and labour pains. The leaf contains essential oils.

Weed risk 
Rubus rosifolius is an introduced environmental weed in the Hawaiian Islands, Puerto Rico and French Polynesia, and extreme caution should be adopted when considering introducing this plant into regions where it is not already native.

References

External links 

 Photo of herbarium specimen at Missouri Botanical Garden, collected in Cambodia in 2012
 

rosifolius
Bushfood
Flora of Asia
Flora of Mauritius
Flora of New Caledonia
Flora of Papuasia
Flora of Vanuatu
Fruits originating in Asia
Plants described in 1791
Rosales of Australia